Ixylasia is a genus of moths in the subfamily Arctiinae. The genus was erected by Arthur Gardiner Butler in 1876.

Species
 Ixylasia pyroproctis Druce, 1905
 Ixylasia schausi Druce, 1896
 Ixylasia semivitreata Hampson, 1905
 Ixylasia trogon Draudt, 1917
 Ixylasia trogonoides Walker, 1864

References

External links

Arctiinae